Robert Salesbury (1567–1599), of Rûg, Corwen, Merionethshire and Bachymbyd, Llanynys, Denbighshire and Pool Park, Ruthin, Denbighshire, was a Welsh politician.

He was a Member (MP) of the Parliament of England for Denbighshire in 1586 and Merioneth in 1589.

References

1567 births
1599 deaths
16th-century Welsh politicians
Members of the Parliament of England for Denbighshire
People from Merionethshire
Members of the Parliament of England (pre-1707) for constituencies in Wales
English MPs 1586–1587
English MPs 1589